Masters W45 discus world record progression is the progression of world record improvements of the discus W45 division of Masters athletics.  Records must be set in properly conducted, official competitions under the standing IAAF rules unless modified by World Masters Athletics.

The W45 division consists of female athletes who have reached the age of 45 but have not yet reached the age of 50, so exactly from their 45th birthday to the day before their 50th birthday. The W45 division throws exactly the same 1 kg implement as the Open division.

Key

References

Masters Athletics Discus list
All Time Athletics

Masters athletics world record progressions
Discus